is an animated film based on the novel by C. W. Nicol. Directed by Kazuki Ōmori, it was released theatrically in Japan on July 22, 2000. It was also broadcast in Latin America by HBO, France by AK Video, in Spain by HBO and in Russia by MC Entertainment. The film was adapted into a play by Japan's Atom Theater Company.

Plot
The young boy Amon has the mysterious power of the ancient "wind people". His father, a brilliant military scientist of the Golden Snake Empire, does not want to use his son's powers for weapons of mass destruction. He burns his papers and lab and tries to escape from the country with his family, but is killed in the attempt. Amon is taken prisoner by the Golden Snake Empire's despotic ruler, Branik, who intends for Amon's powers to produce a new super-weapon. Amon escapes to Heart Island when an eagle explains to him how to see the wind and fly. On Heart Island, Amon learns a bit about the history of the wind people from a bear. He then flies off and settles in a small fishing village. There, he befriends a young girl his own age, Maria. When Branik and the Golden Snake Empire launch an attack on the village, Maria's family are killed and Maria flees with Amon. Eventually Amon and Maria are recaptured, Maria thrown in prison and Amon forced to work on weapons. Amon joins a small revolution against Branik.

Characters

Amon
A young boy with powers of the ancient wind people. He can create small balls of light, called "light play", and converse with animals. Eventually he discovers the ability to see the wind and fly, as well as other ancient powers.

Branik
The despotic ruler of the Golden Snake Empire.

Maria
A young girl from a fishing village, she befriends Amon.

Lucia
A scientist, assistant to Amon's father, who becomes the Golden Snake Empire's head weapons scientist.

Reception
A reviewer at Mania.com commends the film for its "beautifully drawn and animated" graphics and "top-notch" cinematography. However, they criticised the film's imitation of Hayao Miyazaki's films.

References

External links

2000 anime films
Anime films based on novels
Brain's Base
Films based on Japanese novels
Japanese animated films